Trefrize is a hamlet east of Coad's Green in Cornwall, England, United Kingdom.

References

Hamlets in Cornwall